The H.I.V.E. (Huge Immersive Virtual Environment) is a joint research project between the departments of Psychology,  Computer Science, and Systems Analysis at Miami University. The project is funded by a grant from the U.S. Army Research Office and is currently the world's largest virtual environment in terms of navigable floor area (currently over 1200m2).  The goal of the research project is to conduct experiments in human spatial cognition.

System Components
The H.I.V.E. platform consists of several components, including:
 Position-Tracking Camera Array
 Wearable Rendering System

References

Waller, D., Bachmann, E., Hodgson, E., & Beall, A. C. (2007). The HIVE: A Huge Immersive Virtual Environment for research in spatial cognition. Behavior Research Methods, 39, 835–843.

External links
 Official HIVE Site

Miami University